Death Is My Trade  is the British title of a biographical novel by Robert Merle.  The protagonist, Rudolf Lang, was closely based on the real Rudolf Höß, commandant of the concentration camp Auschwitz.

Summary
The story begins in 1913, when Lang is 13 years old. His parents give him a harsh Catholic education, to which he reacts badly. His unstable father, with whom the young Lang has an awkward relationship, wants him to become a priest.  At the age of fifteen, Lang starts a military career which leads in 1943 to the post of commandant of Auschwitz.  At first a concentration camp, later an extermination camp, the camp, near town of Auschwitz, was the site of the “slow and clumsy creation of a death factory”.  Lang works hard to achieve his mission: to  kill as many Jews as possible, disposing of the bodies as efficiently as possible.

Differences to the real Rudolf Höß

In his book, Robert Merle renamed Rudolf Höß as Rudolf Lang, his nickname after demobilization from the SS.  Adolf Eichmann was renamed Wulfslang, but kept his rank of Obersturmbannführer (Lieutenant Colonel).

Robert Merle utilized Rudolf Höß’s testimonies, written in jail after his trial, as well as court records from the Nuremberg trials.

However, he came to the conclusion:

This, however, is an interpretation partly based on psychoanalysis and probably Merle's desire to explain how a human being could commit Höß' actions. Merle's Lang is an idealised version of Höß, stylised as a tragic persona.

While it is true that Höß tried in his process to exonerate his subordinates by declaring they did nothing but follow his orders, which he gave following in turn Heinrich Himmler's orders, there were multiple cases of corruption in Höß' time as commandant.

Absolutely true, and also backed by Höß' autobiography as well as Jean-Claude Pressac's Auschwitz: Technique and Operation of the Gas Chambers and The Crematories of Auschwitz is the depiction of Höß/Lang as not especially antisemitic or suffering from hatred to the other target groups of Nazi extermination policy, like gypsies in Porajmos, Poles or Russians. The "special treatment" (Sonderbehandlung) was just the execution of an order for Höß or other protagonists of Nazi extermination, like Frank Prüfer who constructed and built the crematories of Auschwitz, fulfilling an order to the Topf crematories branch.

The literary depiction of the execution of Nazi extermination policy not out of an antisemitic or antiziganist ideology, but as the mere fulfillment of orders, using methods of industrial science to optimise the process to economically leading "units" ( (plural)) to receive "special treatment", thereby making objects out of living persons and creating an utter feeling of horror, may be the greatest achievement of Merle.

Movie 

Bibliography
 Robert Merle, Death is my Trade, London : Derek Verschoyle, 1954, 
 Merle, Robert. La Mort est mon métier, Edition Gallimard,  
 Höss, Rudolf. Commandant of Auschwitz: The Autobiography of Rudolf Hoess. (Constantine FitzGibbon, trans.) London: Phoenix Press, 2000. .
 Höß, Rudolf. Kommandant in Auschwitz; autobiographische Aufzeichnungen. Veröffentlichungen des Instituts für Zeitgeschichte. Deutscher Taschenbuch Verlag, 1998.

See also

 Second World War
 Auschwitz
 concentration camp
 extermination camp
 Shoah

External links

Notes

1952 French novels
1952 British novels
Novels about the Holocaust
Éditions Gallimard books
1952 speculative fiction novels